Swing time is a swing jazz style.

Swing Time may also refer to:

 Swing Time (film), a 1936 movie directed by George Stevens starring Fred Astaire and Ginger Rogers
 Swing Time (novel), a 2016 novel by Zadie Smith
 Swing Time Records, a record label active in the 1940s and '50s